The Most High can refer to:

El Elyon, God of Israel.
Al-Ala, chapter in the Quran.